Shaadi Mubarak is an Indian drama television series produced under Shashi Sumeet Productions. It premiered on 24 August 2020 on Star Plus. It stars Rati Pandey and Manav Gohil. The final episode was broadcast on 20 April 2021.

Plot
Preeti, a simple and caring woman, wishes to earn self-respect by working as a wedding planner after her son, Tarun, and his wife, Rati, deserted and throw her out of the house.

On the other side, KT, who appears happy, hides a deep wound within. When Chanda Rathore, a prospective bride for KT, insults him because he rejected her, KT's uncle Sushant motivates him to work again.

KT offers a partnership to Preeti, which she initially denies but agrees when KT stands for her before a wretched client. They face many issues in their initial days of business, but this leads them to develop a bond of friendship, trust, and respect.

Tarun puts forth a challenge before Preeti where, in 25 days, she will have to prove herself capable of becoming a businesswoman. With KT's help, she wins.

While organizing Bua Sa and Fufa Sa's 50th wedding anniversary, misunderstandings occur, leading Preeti to break her partnership with KT after finishing an event with a mysterious client.

On the day of the wedding event, the mysterious client turns out to be KT's ex-wife, Nandini. To get his revenge, KT marries Preeti. However, Preeti knows that their relationship is respect for each other.

After their marriage, Preeti falls in love with KT, and they collaborate to discover Nandini's motive.

On the day of Makar Sankranti, Nandini discloses Arjun is an orphan. KT is caught in a fire but is saved by Preeti. Nandini is arrested but vows to return. Later, Tarun and Arjun apologize to Preeti for mistreating her.
Preeti then confesses her love to KT. He initially tells Preeti that he love her too but he confessed to Neel that he lied.

Kusum breaks ties with Preeti when Neel denies having any feelings for Priyanka and becomes engaged to Shika. Neel tells KT and Preeti that Kushaala pressured him to marry as they went through a business crisis. Preeti and KT arrange the money through Shaadi Mubarak. Kusum apologizes to Preeti and gives her blessings to Priyanka and Neel. Preeti and KT both agree to divorce, as KT doesn't love Preeti.

While Preeti leaves for Mumbai, KT realizes he is in love with her. Desperate to win her back, KT rushes to Preeti and declares his love for her publicly, and they reconcile.

Kusum goes abroad with Aastha for her studies. Preeti is heartbroken after being diagnosed with ovarian cancer. KT and Peeeti long for a child so they chose Phurti, a carefree bubbly girl who dreams of settling in London, as a surrogate in return for sending her to London. Phurti becomes pregnant with KT and Preeti's child through IVF. Preeti introduces Phurti as her sister to the family as she begins to live in the Tibrewal Mansion.

The Tibrewals are in turmoil following the revelations regarding Phurti's pregnancy as KT accepts the baby as his and Preeti's. Kushaala criticizes Preeti for taking her son away from her after KT takes a stand on his and Preeti's decision to choose surrogacy to get KT and the family a child. After some tension, the family eventually accepts the surrogacy situation.

Eight months later
Juhi finds a doctor that can cure Preeti. While KT and Preeti's baby shower occurs, Kushaala finds Preeti in pain after slipping in the bathroom and admits her to the hospital. After seeing Preeti at the cancer hospital in Delhi on the news, KT confronts Juhi, revealing about Preeti's illness. Phurti goes into premature labor and delivers a girl. Preeti's surgery is successful, but she is suffering from amnesia. While the hospital catches on fire, Preeti helps a pregnant Shikha and is taken in by her and her husband, Vishal.Priyanka gives birth to her son,Beer.

Five years Later
KT has an emotional outburst when he does not find Preeti and blames Kushaala for not caring for her. Vishal and Shikha go to the hospital to find out about Preeti's family, but some confusion leads them to think that Preeti is a different patient, Mohi Bansal. Shikha delivers a baby girl but asks Mohi to take care of her after an accident. Vishal hates Mohi, thinking she is the reason for Shikha's death. KT stops his family from performing Preeti's last rituals and states that she will return.

KT is an RJ and a doting father of his and Preeti's daughter, Kirti. Preeti, who still thinks she is 'Mohi,' moves to Udaipur. Shikha and Vishal's daughter, also named Preeti, and Kirti is admitted to the same school. Kirti, not knowing Mohi is her mother, dislikes her when she makes her clean the school floor. Mohi hates KT when he rusticates her after Kirti complains to him about her.

Mohi calls KT to confront him about his decision, but he does not answer, so she goes to the Tibrewal mansion. The Tibrewals are happily celebrating Holi while KT feels Mohi's presence and searches for her. KT encounters Mohi, and she warns him to retract his complaint. Everyone becomes emotional seeing her while she furiously goes from there.

KT learns about Mohi's past and befriends her, but he hides his identity and goes by the name "Keertan". Mohi accepts Keertan's request to join Shaadi Mubarak, but after learning that the owner is none other than KT she immediately declines the job offer. Keertan makes Mohi realize that KT is not a bad person and she rejoins the office.

KT is frozen to his place after Kirti gets stuck in a fire and remembers the hospital incident. Mohi rescues her while KT scolds Kirti for not respecting Mohi. Vishal plans vengeance on Mohi for separating his daughter from him. Mohi suspects Keertan's intentions after he takes KT's side whenever he lands into trouble. Kushaala confronts Priyanka and Neel after overhearing their conversation to separate Mohi and little Preeti. Priyanka stands her ground by stating that she feels Mohi isn't getting what she deserves and reveals that she has suffered from two miscarriages and is only doing what's best for the family. Mohi witnesses Kirti and little Preeti being kidnapped, and rescues them. The show ends with Mohi getting attacked and becoming unconscious.

Cast

Main
Rajshree Thakur / Rati Pandey as Preeti Jindal Tibrewal: A widow who starts the wedding company, "Shaadi Mubarak" with Keertan Tibrewal; KT's wife and business partner; Juhi, Tarun and Kirti's mother; Arjun's adoptive mother; Jr. Preeti's foster mother. (2020) / (2020-2021) 
Manav Gohil as Keertan "KT" Tibrewal: Former Rajasthani film star; An RJ; Kushala and JP's son; Neel's cousin; Nandini's ex-husband; Preeti's husband and business partner; Kirti's father; Arjun's adoptive father (2020–2021)

Recurring
Rajeshwari Sachdev as Kusum Kothari: Sumedh, Priyanka, Aastha and Kajal's mother; Preeti's best friend. (2020-2021)
Shefali Singh Soni as Juhi Jindal Kothari: Preeti's daughter; Tarun's sister; Kirti's half-sister; Arjun's adoptive sister; Sumedh's wife. (2020–2021)
Barbiee Sharma as Kirti Tibrewal: KT and Preeti's daughter; Phurti's surrogate daughter; Juhi and Tarun's half-sister; Arjun's adoptive sister. (2021)
Puvika Gupta as Jr. Preeti Agrawal: Vishal and Shikha's daughter; Preeti's foster daughter. (2021)
Sandeep Mehta as Jay Prakash "JP" Tibrewal: Owner of Tibrewal Antiques; Sushant's brother; Kushaala's husband; KT's father; Kirti's grandfather. (2020–2021)
Dolly Minhas as Kushaala Tibrewal: JP's wife, KT's mother; Kirti's grandmother. (2020–2021)
Manu Malik as Sushant Tibrewal: JP's brother; Sneha's husband; Neel's father. (2020–2021)
Priyamvada Singh as Sneha Tibrewal: Sushant's wife; Neel's mother. (2020-2021)
Kabeer Kumar as Neel "NT" Tibrewal: Sneha and Sushant's son; KT's cousin; Shika's ex-fiancé; Priyanka's husband. (2020-2021)
Aleya Ghosh as Priyanka "Pihu" Kothari Tibrewal: Kusum's eldest daughter, Sumedh, Aastha and Kajal's sister; Amit's ex-fiancée; Neel's wife. (2020–2021)
Gaurav Sharmaa as Tarun Jindal: Preeti's son; Juhi's brother; Kirti's half-brother; Arjun's adoptive brother; Rati's husband. (2020–2021)
Akansha Sareen as Rati Jindal: Tarun's wife. (2020–2021)
Naman Gor as Arjun "AT" Tibrewal: KT and Preeti's adoptive son; Juhi, Tarun and Kirti's adoptive brother. (2020–2021)
Achherr Bhaardwaj as Sumedh Kothari: Kusum's son, Priyanka, Aastha and Kajal's brother; Juhi's husband. (2020–2021)
Nisha Rawal as Chanda Rathore: Owner of Dream Bell Event Planning Company; Rati's boss. (2020-2021)
Barkha Sengupta as Nandini Chitrubal: KT's ex-wife; Arjun's former adoptive mother.  (2020–2021)
Pracheen Chauhan as Vishal Agrawal: Shikha's widower; Jr. Preeti's father. (2021)
Ayushi Bhatia as Aastha Kothari: Kusum's second daughter; Sumedh, Priyanka and Kajal's sister. (2020)
Trupti Mishra as Kajal "Choti" Kothari: Kusum's youngest daughter; Sumedh, Priyanka and Aastha's sister. (2020)
Aashish Kaul as Mr. Nathmal: Business tycoon who chooses Dream Bell for his daughter's wedding. (2020)
Vaishnavi Mahant as Mrs. Gopalani: Who wants her son's wedding in a grandiose way and doesn't like people who have no grooming sense so dislikes Preeti. Breaks the contract after having an argument with KT. (2020)
Rohit Suchanti as Aryan Mantri: Wants everything to be trendy and cool. Later decides to do a court marriage after his father's dirty act. (2020)
Nasirr Khan as Mr. Mantri: Aryan's father (2020)
Heli Daruwala as Tiya: Dancer at Aryan's cocktail party (2020)
Ashwini Shukla as Sheena: Shaadi Mubarak's secretary. (2020–2021)
Neelu Vaghela as Bua: Preeti's former aunt-in-law (2020)
Yashodhan Bal as Fufa: Preeti's former uncle-in-law (2020)
Dnyanada Ramtirthkar as Phurti: A con woman who deceives people to get money/ However is a bubbly girl who dreams of going to London. Kirti's surrogate mother. (2021)
Shweta Gulati as Shikha Agrawal: Vishal's late wife. Junior Preeti's mother. (2021)
Deepak Soni as Inspector Deshmukh: He helps find the kidnappers of Preeti and KT's child. (2021)

Production

Development
The shooting of the series was supposed to begin in March 2020. However, due to the COVID-19 outbreak in India, all the television and film shootings were indefinitely stalled from 19 March 2020, and the series shooting was postponed. After four months, the shooting of the series began in July 2020.

On 16 September 2020, the shoot was stalled after Rajeshwari Sachdev tested positive for COVID-19. Sachdev shot for her sequences from her home until she recovered. The show took a five-year leap on 28 March 2021.

On 13 April 2021, Manav Gohil tested positive for COVID-19. On the same day, Chief Minister of Maharashtra, Uddhav Thackeray, announced a sudden curfew from 15 April 2021, and the series' shooting was halted. Later, it was reported that the show would be shifted to Bikaner to continue shooting. After many discussions with the team about further shooting, the producers decided to wait until lockdown completes in Maharashtra and then continue shooting once Gohil recovers. On 20 April 2021, the last of the show's 206 episodes was broadcast.

Release
The first promo was released on 30 July 2020 featuring the leads and premiered on 24 August 2020 at 7:30 pm time slot on StarPlus.

On 21 April 2021, due to the sudden halt in the series' shooting, its 7.30 slot was given to another StarPlus show, Pandya Store.

Casting
Initially, Kabeer Kumar was cast for playing the character of Preeti's son, Tarun. However, he was replaced by Gaurav Sharma in July 2020. Later, he was offered the role of Keertan's cousin.

In the middle of October 2020, lead actress Rajshree Thakur quit to take care of her health, mentioning the hectic schedule of the series and was immediately replaced by Rati Pandey. Thakur played her role for 54 episodes.

Reception

The Times of India stated, "Rajashree Thakur's fight to earn respect, Manav Gohil's charismatic presence and Rajeshwari Sachdev steals the show."

References

2020 Indian television series debuts
2021 Indian television series endings
StarPlus original programming
Hindi-language television shows
Indian television soap operas
Television shows set in Rajasthan